Several ships have been named Drake (for Royal Navy ships, see HMS Drake):

Ella Drake, an American wooden schooner built in 1868. Official no. 185702
M.M. Drake, a tug built in 1879. Official no. 91151. After burning in 1899, the hull was rebuilt and renamed Jessie. Abandoned in 1920.
L.W. Drake, an American wooden barge built in 1881 Official no. 45145. Stranded and abandoned under Canadian registry in 1903.
, an American wooden schooner. Official no. 91485. Foundered with her tow, the schooner Michigan, off Vermilion Point in 1901.
MV Xanthea, formerly MV Drake, a bulk carrier launched in 2006

See also
 

Ship names